National Highway 347 is a national highway in state of Madhya Pradesh in India. It is a branch of National Highway 47. It connects two primary highways, NH47 and NH44.

Route 
Multai - Chikhli - Dunawa - Ghat pipariya -Chhindwara

Junctions  
 
  Terminal near Multai.
  near Chhindwara.
  Terminal near Seoni.

Toll plaza 
There are two toll plazas located on NH-347.

 Chikhalikala toll plaza for Multaichhindwara - Seroni stretch.
 Fulara toll plaza for Chindwara (Ring Road)-Seoni stretch.

See also 
 List of National Highways in India
 List of National Highways in India by state

References

External links
NH 347 on OpenStreetMap

National highways in India
National Highways in Madhya Pradesh